The Marshall-Brennan Constitutional Literacy Project is an educational fellowship program in which law students act as teaching fellows, teaching constitutional law and oral advocacy courses in underserved high schools. Headquartered at the Washington College of Law in Washington, D.C., the Marshall-Brennan Constitutional Literacy Project was founded in the fall of 1999 by Professor Jamie Raskin. The program began as a way of addressing civic disengagement and a lack of political participation. The teaching fellows work with teachers, administrators and lawyers to teach high school students their rights as citizens, the strategic benefits of voting, how lawmaking occurs, and other fundamental constitutional processes. High school students in the program have the opportunity to practice their oral advocacy skills in a national moot court competition.

Since its inception, the Marshall-Brennan Constitutional Literacy Project has had chapters in twenty U.S. law schools, with 18 currently in operation.

Background and creation
The Marshall-Brennan Constitutional Literacy Project was conceived by law professor Jamin Raskin, when he was approached by a group of high school students in Montgomery County, Maryland, who felt their freedom of speech was being violated.  The students were part of a communications academy at their school and helped run a talk show on a local cable television station affiliated with the school. They had put together a program called "Shades of Gray," during which they interviewed experts on difficult topics of the day. One particular show included a debate on gay marriage, and the students had lined up two speakers in favor of gay marriage and two against. The program was taped and approved by the teacher who oversaw it.

However, the show was pulled before it aired. School officials deemed the show "inappropriate" for the station. When the students contacted him, Professor Raskin wanted to go straight to court, but the students asked for help in first exhausting all remedies at the school district level before pursuing litigation. In the end, the students appealed to the school board and won a reversal of the superintendent's censorship of the program. The program aired six times instead of the one or two times it would have aired had the superintendent allowed it in the first place.

This experience led Professor Raskin to the realization that high school students, especially urban students, are not taught about the Constitution and how it affects their daily lives. When he compared the resources he had to this need for constitutional literacy, the idea for the project was born.

The project officially started in the fall of 1999 with 20 law students who volunteered to teach in eight public schools in Washington, D.C. and Montgomery County.

Current chapters and leadership
The Marshall-Brennan Constitutional Literacy Project currently has twenty-one chapters and is led out of Washington College of Law in Washington, D.C.

Current Chapters

American University Washington College of Law, Washington, D.C. (1999–present)
University of California Hastings College of the Law
Yale Law School in New Haven, Connecticut (2009–present)
Howard University School of Law in Washington, D.C.
Sandra Day O'Connor College of Law, Arizona State University, Tempe, Arizona
Rutgers School of Law, Camden, New Jersey
Thomas R. Kline School of Law, Drexel University, Philadelphia, Pennsylvania
Louis D. Brandeis School of Law, University of Louisville, Louisville, Kentucky
Suffolk University Law School, Boston, Massachusetts
Southern University Law Center, Baton Rouge, Louisiana
Mitchell Hamline School of Law, Saint Paul, Minnesota
University of Colorado Law School, Boulder, Colorado
University of Connecticut School of Law, Hartford, Connecticut
William & Mary Law School, Williamsburg, VA
Washington University School of Law, St. Louis, Missouri
University of New Mexico School of Law, Albuquerque, New Mexico (2015–present)
Santa Clara University School of Law, Santa Clara, California
Arizona Summit Law School, Phoenix, Arizona
University of Pittsburgh School of Law, Pittsburgh, PA 
University of New Mexico School of Law, Albuquerque, NM
Capital University Law School, Columbus, OH
South Texas College of Law, Houston, TX

Current Program Directors
The Marshall-Brennan Constitutional Literacy Project is currently directed by Professor Camille A. Thompson.  Professor Stephen Wermiel currently serves as the faculty adviser to the program.

Chapter Requirements
Chapters must meet seven requirements:
Partnership between a law school(s) and an underserved local public school system or local public high school(s).
Academic credit: both law students AND high school students earn academic credit for participating in the Marshall-Brennan Project.
Unified Curriculum: All Marshall-Brennan fellows use one or both of the textbooks (We the Students and/or Youth Justice in America)
Shared goals: to improve high school students’ oral advocacy skills, cultivate critical thinking skills, and instill understanding of Constitutional cases and concepts.
Support and supervision by a faculty and/or staff member at the law school.
Regular communication with the national office at American University Washington College of Law.
Representation at the annual Directors’ Meetings and National Marshall-Brennan High School Moot Court Competition as much as possible.

Curriculum
The Marshall-Brennan Constitutional Literacy Project utilizes two different text books for its two sets of curriculum: Youth Justice in America and We the Students.  Both books utilize case law and constitutional analysis to walk students through complex legal issues in an easy to understand fashion.  Youth Justice in America focuses on criminal law and criminal procedure as they pertain to students, while We the Students gives students a broad survey of the United States Constitution.

Teaching fellows are involved in curriculum design, lesson planning, classroom teaching, and the organization of moot court competitions

Observance of Constitution Day
In honor of Constitution Day, the Marshall-Brennan Constitutional Literacy Project prepares lesson plans and educational materials to be used by teachers who wish to educate their students about the importance of the U.S. Constitution and its very real effect on the lives of students.  The prepared materials are distributed through the website Band of Rights.

National Marshall-Brennan High School Moot Court Competition

The National Marshall-Brennan Moot Court Competition serves as an opportunity for high school students participating in Marshall-Brennan Constitutional Literacy Project classes to showcase their oral advocacy skills, network, and learn about careers in the law.

Usually held in the Spring, the National Moot Court Competition presents high school students with a unique legal issue each year, ranging from First Amendment violations to Eighth Amendment prohibitions against placing juveniles in prison for life without parole.  Each student is assigned the role of either Petitioner or Respondent and must argue their case in front of a three judge panel composed of law students, law professors, and practicing attorneys.  After advancing through the preliminary rounds, the final rounds are often heard by actual judges who volunteer their time in order to help students garner an understanding of a real appellate level courtroom.

Notable Speakers
During the National Moot Court Competition in 2012, Mary Beth Tinker of the famous Supreme Court case Tinker v. Des Moines Independent Community School District spoke to the competitors about the importance of knowing one's rights and of knowing how the justice system can affect their everyday lives.

References

External links
Marshall-Brennan Constitutional Literacy Project Website
Marshall-Brennan Constitutional Literacy Project in the Media

Legal education in the United States